Dionigi Tettamanzi (14 March 1934 – 5 August 2017) was an Italian prelate of the Roman Catholic Church, who was named a cardinal in 1998. He was Archbishop of Genoa from 1995 to 2004 and Archbishop of Milan from 2004 to 2011.

Early years
Tettamanzi was born on 14 March 1934 in Renate, then in the province of Milan, now in the province of Monza and Brianza. He was educated at the Minor Seminary of Seveso and the Seminary of Venegono Inferiore and finally at the Pontifical Gregorian University in Rome where he earned a doctorate in theology. After studying in local seminaries, he was ordained a priest on 28 June 1957 by Archbishop Giovanni Battista Montini, the future Pope Paul VI. He served in the Archdiocese of Milan as a pastor and faculty member at the Minor Seminary of Masnago and of Seveso San Pietro from 1960 until 1966. He was a faculty member of the Seminary of Venegono from 1966 to 1986.

Bishop
On 1 July 1989 Pope John Paul II named Tettamanzi Archbishop of Ancona-Osimo. He received his episcopal consecration from Cardinal Carlo Maria Martini at the Milan cathedral on 23 September. Tettamanzi submitted his resignation as bishop on 6 April 1991 to take up a five-year assignment as Secretary-General of the Italian Episcopal Conference.

John Paul II appointed him Archbishop of Genoa on 20 April 1995. He helped John Paul draft his 1995 encyclical Evangelium Vitae (1995).

At the consistory of 21 February 1998, Tettamanzi was created Cardinal-Priest of Ss. Ambrogio e Carlo. He was named to succeed Martini as archbishop of Milan on 11 July 2002.

Although thought one of the favorite candidates to succeed John Paul II in 2005, there were reports that he received few votes in the conclave. Tettamanzi was said to speak only Italian. He was little known outside his own country.

In 2006, giving the opening address at the decennial conference of the Italian Catholic Church, he challenged the traditional alliance of the hierarchy with the country's conservative parties and called for more flexibility in forming alliances in contrast to the preference of Cardinal Camillo Ruini, head of the Italian Episcopal Conference, for Silvio Berlusconi. He said: "It is better to be Christian without saying it, than to proclaim it without being it."

In response to Pope Benedict's Summorum Pontificum of July 2007, Tettamanzi stated that the rules it presented for the celebration of the Mass in different forms did not apply to the Milan archdiocese since it uses the Ambrosian Rite rather than the Roman.

In March 2009, as required upon reaching the age of 75, he submitted his resignation, and Pope Benedict accepted it on the 54th anniversary of his ordination to the priesthood, 28 June 2011.

In July 2012, he was named apostolic administrator of the Diocese of Vigevano. He served in that post for a year.

He was one of the cardinal electors who participated in the 2013 papal conclave that selected Pope Francis.

In 2015, at the behest of Pope Francis, he produced a study of the feasibility of creating a Dicastery for the Laity, Family and Life for consideration by the Council of Cardinals. In September 2015, Pope Francis nominated him to participate in the Synod on the Family in October. He supported, under certain conditions, admitting the divorced and remarried to the Eucharist.

He died on 5 August 2017, after a long illness. Cardinal Tettamanzi is buried in the metropolitan Cathedral of Milan.

Views

Social relations
In his speech on St. Ambrose day in 2008, he said that Muslims have the right to build their mosques in the cities of predominantly Catholic countries. In his speech on St. Ambrose day 2010 he defended immigrants to Italy against attempts to classify them as criminals.

Remarried Catholics
In 2008, in a letter addressed to Catholics who had divorced and remarried, he wrote:

He said he wanted to "establish dialogue ... to try to hear about your daily life, to allow myself to be questioned by some of your questions.... The Church has not forgotten nor rejected you, nor does it consider you unworthy. For the Church, and for me, as a bishop, you are my beloved brothers and sisters."

In 2014, he published Il Vangelo della misericordia per le famiglie ferite (The Gospel of Mercy for Wounded Families) and said he anticipated allowing divorced and remarried Catholics to receive communion as long as there is no confusion about the Church's insistence on the indissolubility of marriage and there is "a restored commitment to Christian life through faithful paths that are true and serious."

References

External links 
Archdiocese of Milan

1934 births
2017 deaths
20th-century Italian Roman Catholic archbishops
20th-century Italian cardinals
Roman Catholic archbishops of Genoa
Archbishops of Milan
Cardinals created by Pope John Paul II
Pontifical Gregorian University alumni
Members of the Congregation for the Clergy
Members of the Congregation for Catholic Education
Members of the Congregation for the Oriental Churches
People from Brianza
Members of the Order of the Holy Sepulchre
21st-century Italian cardinals